Allan Stone (born 14 October 1945) is a former tennis player from Australia. He played amateur and professional tennis in the 1960s and 1970s. He was ranked as high as world No. 36 in singles and world No. 12 in doubles on the ATP rankings.

Stone found the majority of his success on the doubles court. He won 15 doubles titles during his career, including the Australian Open in 1977 and the Australian Championships (the predecessor to the Australian Open) in 1968. He made the doubles final at Wimbledon in 1975 alongside Colin Dowdeswell and won the US  National Doubles Championship in 1969 with Dick Crealy.

In singles, he won three titles and reached four finals, including Cincinnati. In 1972 he made the semifinal of the Australian Open singles, where he was defeated by that year's champion, Ken Rosewall.

Stone was selected to play Davis Cup for Australia and participated in five Davis Cup ties. His Davis Cup win-loss record is 6-0.

Born in Launceston, Tasmania, Stone moved to Victoria at a young age and played amateur tennis for the Warburton Tennis Club where he was coached by Mary Morton.

He attended Caulfield Grammar School and completed a Commerce Degree at the University of Melbourne.

1969 US Open 
There is some confusion over the 1969 US Open Championship title, which is held by Stone and Dick Crealy conjointly with Ken Rosewall and Fred Stolle.

The era of Open Tennis commenced in 1968, and at that time Boston was the home of the U.S. National Doubles Championship. However, the agents of some contract professionals demanded guaranteed prize money which could not be covered by the tournament. Accordingly, contract professionals boycotted the tournament, with many playing instead at Forest Hills, which was won by Rosewall and Stolle. Crealy and Stone won the doubles in Boston in 1969 as professionals, defeating Charlie Pasarell and Bill Bowrey.

In 1971, the USTA and Association of Tennis Professionals decided to combine the winners of both tournaments to make the Grand Slam tournament. This was not an issue for the winners of 1968 as both tournaments were won by Smith and Lutz. Crealy and Stone were asked if they would agree to share the 1969 title with Rosewall and Stolle - they readily agreed, especially as the latter were two of the great Australian players and because "tennis was played with much goodwill in those days."

Career finals

Doubles (15 titles, 19 runner-ups)

Singles (3 titles, 6 runner-ups)

Post-playing career
Stone is a sports commentator.

See also
 List of Caulfield Grammar School people

References

External links
 
 
 
 

}

1945 births
Living people
Australian Championships (tennis) champions
Australian male tennis players
Australian Open (tennis) champions
Sportspeople from Launceston, Tasmania
Australian tennis commentators
Tennis people from Tasmania
People educated at Caulfield Grammar School
Grand Slam (tennis) champions in men's doubles